Kentucky Route 169 (KY 169) is a  state highway in the U.S. state of Kentucky. KY 169 travels from U.S. Route 25 Business (US 25 Bus.) in Richmond to KY 33 south of Versailles via Nicholasville and Keene. The highway crosses the Kentucky River via the Valley View Ferry.

Major intersections

References

0169